Heinrich (Henry) Richert Voth (15 April 1855 – 2 June 1931) was an ethnographer and Mennonite missionary and minister. He was born in Alexanderwohl, Southern Russia. Voth was sent by the Mission Board of the General Conference Mennonite Church to work among the Arapaho and the Hopi people.

Life and career
Voth learned the Arapaho language and customs at Darlington, Indian Territory, near Fort Reno, where he worked from June 1882 to January 1892. Voth was made superintendent in 1884. He married Barbara Baer from the mission the same year, they had a daughter, Frieda. His wife died in 1889. Voth married Martha Moser, who had also worked at Darlington, in 1892 and they both went to work at Oraibi with the 3rd mesa Hopi, Northern Arizona the next year. Martha Voth died in 1901. Henry Voth had witnessed the Ghost Dance revivalism among his Arapaho congregation. He collected objects and later sold them to the Bureau of American Ethnology.  At Oraibi Voth supported many anthropologists from around the world in their Pueblo studies and collected objects for many institutions, for Fred Harvey, but also for the Hamburg and Berlin anthropological museums.  His closest collaboration was with George A. Dorsey from Chicago. The Field Museum published Voth's series of precise descriptions of Hopi ceremonies and folklore, illustrated with his Kodak No. 1 photographs. Voth was one of very few non native writers on the Hopi fluent in the Hopi language. Among his papers at Bethel College are his studies in the Arapaho language, Hopi religion, and a Hopi dictionary. Voth left the Hopi and the Heathen Mission field in 1903.

He married Katie Hershler in 1906 and from 1914 to 1927 served the Zoar Mennonite Church in Goltry, Oklahoma as its resident minister. He died in 1931 in Newton, Kansas.

Works 
The Field Columbian Museum, Chicago, published Voth' s papers in its Anthropological Series, Vols. 3, 6 and 11:
 The Oraibi Powamu Ceremony, 3(2), 64- 158, 1901
 The Oraibi Summer Snake Ceremony, 3(4), 263- 358, 1903
 The Oraibi Oaqöl Ceremony, 6(1), 1- 46, 1903
 The Traditions of the Hopi, 1905
 Oraibi Natal Customs and Ceremonies, 6(2), 47- 61
 The Oraibi Marau Ceremony, 11(1), 1- 81, 1912
 Brief Miscellaneous Hopi Papers, 11(2), 89- 149, 1912

In the same series, together with George A. Dorsey:
 The Oraibi Soyal Ceremony, 3(1), 1901
 The Mishongnovi Ceremonies of the Snake and Antelope Fraternities, 3(3), 1901

References

Further reading 
On Hopi linguistics see:
 P. David Seaman: Hopi Linguistics. An Annotated Bibliography. In: Anthropological Linguistics 19, 1977, 2, pp. 78–97.

Essays on Henry R. Voth:
 Barbara A. Thiesen: Every Beginning Is Hard. Darlington Mennonite Mission, 1880–1902. In: Mennonite Life 61, 2006, 2, pp. 1–36, online .
 Fred Eggan: H. R. Voth, Ethnologist. In: Barton Wright: Hopi material culture. Artifacts gathered by H. R. Voth in the Fred Harvey Collection. With an introduction by Byron Harvey III and an essay on H. R. Voth by Fred Eggan. Northland Press u. a., Flagstaff AZ 1979, pp. 1–7.
 John F. Schmidt (ed.): The Autobiography of Henrich R. Voth (1855-1931). In: Mennonite Quarterly Review 40, 1966, pp. 217–226.

External links 
  Global Anabaptist Mennonite Encyclopedia Online entry
 Encyclopedia of Oklahoma History and Culture entry 
  Henry R. Voth with Arapaho children, 1893, photo 
 Every Beginning Is Hard, essay 

1855 births
1931 deaths
Russian Mennonites
American Mennonites
Emigrants from the Russian Empire to the United States
Russian people of German descent
Mennonite missionaries
Russian Protestant missionaries
German Protestant missionaries
American Protestant missionaries
Protestant missionaries in the United States